Mikhail Izrailevich Rabinovich (MIR) (Russian: Михаи́л Изра́илевич Рабино́вич (MИР); born April 20, 1941) is a Russian influential physicist and neuroscientist working in the field of nonlinear dynamics and its applications. His work helped shape the understanding of dynamical systems.

Biography 
Rabinovich was born in 1941 in former Gorky, USSR, into a family of Soviet Jews: Dora Rapoport and Israel Rabinovich. His father was a professor of physical chemistry at Gorky State University and Mikhail developed an interest in sciences at an early age. At the age of 16 he was accepted to the Radio Physics department of the Gorky State University. In 1963 Rabinovich began working under the supervision of A. Gaponov-Grekhov and in 1967 he received a Ph.D. in physics and mathematics. In 1974, Mikhail receives a D.Sc. from the Institute for Physical Problems of the Soviet Academy of Science chaired by Pyotr Kapitsa. In 1986, he co-authored chapters on the evolution of turbulence in the seminal textbook Course of Theoretical Physics (Fluid Mechanics Volume) of Lifshitz and Landau. The book Oscillations and Waves in Linear and Nonlinear Systems was published in 1989. Mikhail Rabinovich became a member of the Russian Academy of Sciences in 1991. In 1992, Mikhail accepted a faculty position at the Institute for Nonlinear Science at UCSD in La Jolla, CA. In the same year a book with Gaponov-Grekhov, Nonlinearities in Action is published. His first book written in the United States, Introduction to Nonlinear Dynamics for Physicists came out in 1993. In 1999, Mikhail was invited to the Pontifical Academy of Sciences in Vatican to give a lecture on global and complex processes in physics. There he met with Pope John Paul II. In 2000, Mikhail published his latest book on physics The dynamics of Patterns.
Mikhail Rabinovich published over 250 peer reviewed articles in leading scientific journals (Science, Neuron, Journal of Neuroscience, PLoS Computational Biology, Reviews of Modern Physics, Physics of Fluids, Physical Review Letters) that are actively cited (over 3000 citations). In 2012, Rabinovich published his first book on neuroscience  Principles of Brain Dynamics: Global State Interactions. Currently he lives in La Jolla, California, and is a research scientist in the Bio Circuits Institute at UCSD.

Selected scientific achievements 
 Mid-1960s - early 1970s: Invention of stable stationary waves in dissipative nonlinear media, with applications to radio electronics, plasma physics, dynamics of lasers.
 Late 1960s - early 1970s: Development of asymptotic methods for the analysis of nonlinear processes in distributed systems: novel idea of representation of the right side of equations in a form of expansion of unknown operators, determined from the condition of minimal error in every approximation. The idea was further developed in applied mathematics.
 1970's: Fundamental works both theoretical and experimental in “deterministic chaos” and conception of turbulence; received world recognition; see Rabinovich–Fabrikant equations.
 1980s: Theoretical and experimental work in dynamics of structures in non-equilibrium media, in particular the discovery of stable particle-like states in dissipative fields.
 Mid-1980s - mid-1990s: Discovery of the synchronization phenomenon of various chaotic systems in radio electronics and neuro-dynamics. Among them, the synchronization of bursting neurons in central pattern generators of biological systems.
 Early 2000s: Introduced a principle of space-time coding of sensory information in living systems: The Winnerless Competition principle; confirmed by experimental evidence.
 2000 - 2006: Proposed a novel dynamics object: “ Stable Heteroclinic Channel” that is present in the phase space of dissipative non-equilibrium system with large number of degrees of freedom. SHC was introduced to describe stable transition processes in neural networks.
 2008 -  current: Formulated fundamental dynamical principles of brain activity and built dynamical models that describe the interaction between emotional and cognitive functions. These principles are currently being clinically tested.

Selected literary works 
 Up the hill   (2001), .
 Rings of time  (2002), .
 Oars (2005), .
 Mim (2009),

References 
Personal Website
Famous Rabinoviches in Soviet Union
Russian Academy of Sciences
Rabinovich on Google Scholar
Bio Circuits Institute

1941 births
Living people
Russian Jews
21st-century Russian physicists
Soviet physicists
20th-century Russian physicists
Corresponding Members of the Russian Academy of Sciences